Red string may be:

Red string (Kabbalah), a thin red string worn to ward off misfortune
 Kalava, the sacred Hindu red string
Red String (webcomic), a manga-style webcomic
 Red thread of fate, an East Asian belief similar to the concept of a soulmate
The Red String (documentary) a documentary film about four Chinese-born girls and their adopted families
Redstring Productions, Inc., an American-based family entertainment company
Red Strings, a group of pro-Union southerners during the American Civil War

See also
Red Thread (disambiguation)